The 45th Infantry Division was an infantry division of the Territorial Force, part of the British Army. It was formed in the First World War as a duplicate of the 43rd (Wessex) Division and was originally formed as the 2nd Wessex Division in 1914–1915 before later being renamed as the 45th (2nd Wessex) Division and the brigades numbered. It was sent overseas to India in December 1914 to relieve Regular Army units for service in France. The division remained there for the rest of the war, supplying drafts of replacements to the British units fighting in the Middle East and later complete battalions.

History
In accordance with the Territorial and Reserve Forces Act 1907 (7 Edw. 7, c.9) which brought the Territorial Force into being, the TF was intended to be a home defence force for service during wartime and members could not be compelled to serve outside the country. However, on the outbreak of war on 4 August 1914, many members volunteered for Imperial Service.  Therefore, TF units were split into 1st Line (liable for overseas service) and 2nd Line (home service for those unable or unwilling to serve overseas) units.  2nd Line units performed the home defence role, although in fact most of these were also posted abroad in due course.

On 15 August 1915, TF units were instructed to separate home service men from those who had volunteered for overseas service (1st Line), with the home service personnel to be formed into reserve units (2nd Line).  On 31 August, 2nd Line units were authorized for each 1st Line unit where more than 60% of men had volunteered for overseas service.  After being organized, armed and clothed, the 2nd Line units were gradually grouped into large formations thereby forming the 2nd Line brigades and divisions.  These 2nd Line units and formations had the same name and structure as their 1st Line parents.  On 24 November, it was decided to replace imperial service (1st Line) formations as they proceeded overseas with their reserve (2nd Line) formations.  A second reserve (3rd Line) unit was then formed at the peace headquarters of the 1st Line.

The 2nd Wessex Division was formed in October 1914 as a 2nd Line duplicate of the Wessex Division.  Most of the units were only raised after the departure of the 1st Line division to India in the same month; officers and men of the 1st Line units left behind formed the core of the new units.  In the event, the division did not consist of much more than 12 infantry battalions and 12 artillery batteries; no ammunition columns, signals or train companies were formed. The divisional engineers and signals remained in the UK and later joined 58th Divisional RE.

On 22 September, India agreed to send 32 British and 20 Indian regular battalions to Europe in exchange for 43 partially trained TF battalions.  Initially, it was intended that the Welsh Division would join the Wessex and Home Counties Divisions in India, but on 25 November, 10 infantry battalions and three field artillery brigades (9 batteries of 15 pounders) of the 2nd Wessex Division were selected instead.  On 12 December, the division embarked at Southampton with 263 officers, 9,344 other ranks and 36 guns.  The 2/4th DCLI and 2/4th Hampshires landed at Karachi on 9 January 1915 and the rest of the division at Bombay between 4 and 8 January.

The division was effectively broken up on arrival in India in January 1915; the units reverted to peacetime conditions and were dispersed throughout India and Burma.  The battalions were posted to Bombay, Poona, Secunderabad (2), Bangalore, Ahmednagar, Karachi, Quetta, Wellington and Meiktila and the artillery brigades at Kirkee, Secunderabad and Bangalore.  The Territorial Force divisions and brigades were numbered in May 1915 in the order that they departed for overseas service, starting with the 42nd (East Lancashire) Division.  The 2nd Wessex Division should have been numbered as the 45th (2nd Wessex) Division, but as the division had already been broken up, this was merely a place holder.  The 2nd/1st Hampshire, 2nd/1st South Western and 2nd/1st Devon and Cornwall Brigades were notionally numbered as 134th, 135th and 136th, respectively.

The units pushed on with training to prepare for active service, handicapped by the need to provide experienced manpower for active service units.  By early 1916 it had become obvious that it would not be possible to transfer the division to the Western Front as originally intended.  Nevertheless, individual units of the division proceeded overseas on active service through the rest of the war.

In 1916 and 1917, the artillery was reorganized; the batteries were initially lettered A, B and C in each brigade, one battery in each brigade was broken up to make the other batteries up to 6 guns and these were then numbered and rearmed with 18 pounders.

In 1917, five battalions went to Palestine between April and October, and two more went to Mesopotamia in September.  By the beginning of 1918, just five batteries and three battalions remained in India.  During 1919, the remaining units were reduced and returned to England and the division ceased to exist.

Orders of Battle

Commanders
Br.-Gen. R.J. Pinney was assigned to command the 2nd Wessex Division on formation on 9 October 1914.  He was replaced two days later by Br.-Gen. G.S.McD. Elliot who remained in command until the division embarked for India.  Br.-Gen. G.H. Nicholson commanded the division on its voyage; he handed over the troops on disembarkation and returned to England, arriving on 3 February 1915.  All three officers had been colonels commanding brigades of the Wessex DivisionDevon and Cornwall, South Western and Hampshire Brigades respectivelyat the outbreak of the war.

See also

 List of British divisions in World War I

Notes

References

Bibliography

External links
 
 

 
 
 
 

Infantry divisions of the British Army in World War I
Military units and formations established in 1914
Military units and formations disestablished in 1919